Pamela Ashley Brown (born November 29, 1983) is an American television reporter and newscaster. Brown works as a weekend anchor and senior Washington Correspondent for CNN. She formerly worked for ABC Washington, D.C., affiliate WJLA-TV, and she is also fill-in and substitute anchor for CNN's At This Hour With Kate Bolduan, The Lead With Jake Tapper, The Situation Room With Wolf Blitzer, and Erin Burnett OutFront. Brown occasionally provided the lead-in to "Politico's Video Playback"—a daily recap of the previous night's U.S. late-night talk shows.

Biography
Brown was born in Lexington, Kentucky, the daughter of businessman and former Governor of Kentucky John Y. Brown Jr. and former Miss America and businesswoman Phyllis George (1949-2020). George took maternity leave from her duties on CBS' NFL pregame show, The NFL Today, to give birth to Pamela. Brown is the granddaughter of politician John Y. Brown Sr. and the half-sister of former Kentucky Secretary of State John Y. Brown, III. Her parents divorced in 1996 after 17 years of marriage, when Brown was 13.

Brown graduated from Henry Clay High School in Lexington and the University of North Carolina at Chapel Hill with a degree in broadcast journalism. While at the University of North Carolina, Brown was a reporter on the university's Carolina Week. After college, she worked for ABC-affiliate WJLA-TV in Washington. Brown is currently pursuing a Master of Laws (LL.M) degree from the George Washington University School of Law.

In January 2021, CNN announced that Brown would move to Senior Washington Correspondent and would host three hours of CNN Newsroom on weekends.

Personal life
Brown has an older brother, Lincoln (born 1980) and three half-siblings from her father's prior marriage. Brown was named after her aunt Pamela Brown, who died in 1970 at the age of 28 together with her husband Rod Anderson and balloonist Malcolm Brighton, in an ill-fated attempt to cross the Atlantic Ocean in a Rozière balloon, Free Life.

Brown married Adam Wright on June 5, 2017. In June 2018, their son Ben was born, followed by daughter Vivienne in February 2020.

References

External links
Pamela Brown's biography on CNN's website
Pamela Brown's biography at WJLA
Profile of Pamela Brown in Washington Post, September 18, 2006

1983 births
Living people
American women television journalists
Brown family of Kentucky
People from Lexington, Kentucky
UNC Hussman School of Journalism and Media alumni
Television anchors from Washington, D.C.
CNN people
Kentucky women news anchors
21st-century American journalists